One Village, A Thousand Voices (یو کلی زر غږونه/یک قریه هزار صدا) is a bilingual(Dari and  Pashto) radio drama series that feature young Afghans as they seek a voice in village-level justice decision-making. The series, which is produced in partnership with Equal Access International airs on Radio Azadi, launched in April 2013 and the episodes are followed once a week by a discussion program.

References

External links
 Pashto
 Dari
 
Radio dramas
Afghan radio programs